New School, International School of Georgia is a primary and secondary international school in Tbilisi, Georgia, serving local and expatriate children from ages 3 to 18. Its curriculum, delivered in English (the English Department) or Georgian (the Georgian Department) conforms with standards of international education. It is accredited by the International Baccalaureate Organisation.

Organisation 
The school has students from many countries. It is Georgia's only school offering all three International Baccalaureate levels: the PYP (Primary Years Programme), MYP (Middle Years Programme) and IB Diploma Programme.

The school has an active extracurricular programme with sports, ski trips, talent shows, field trips and other activities.

History 
The school was founded in 1999.

See also

 Education in Georgia (country)
 International Baccalaureate
 List of international schools

References

Buildings and structures in Tbilisi
Education in Tbilisi
Elementary and primary schools in Georgia (country)
International high schools
International schools in Georgia (country)
International Baccalaureate schools

1999 establishments in Georgia (country)
Educational institutions established in 1999
High schools and secondary schools in Georgia (country)